Uptown Theatre or Uptown Theater may refer to:

 Uptown Theatre (Toronto), demolished
 Uptown Theatre (Chicago), closed
 Uptown Theater (Napa, California)
 Uptown Theatre (Milwaukee), demolished
 Uptown Theater (Kansas City, Missouri)
 Uptown Theater (Minneapolis)
 Uptown Theater (Philadelphia)
 Uptown Theater (Washington, D.C.)
 Uptown Theater (Racine, Wisconsin)
Uptown Theatre (Winnipeg), now Uptown Lofts

See also
 Barrie Uptown Theater,  Barrie, Ontario, Canada